James Marvin may refer to:
James M. Marvin (1809–1901), U.S. Representative from New York
James Marvin (academic) (1820–1901), chancellor of the University of Kansas

See also
James Marvyn (1529–1611), English MP